Pachypanchax sparksorum is a species of Aplocheilid killifish endemic to Madagascar where it is found in the Anjingo River and streams feeding into the Ankofia River.  Its natural habitat is rivers. The specific name of this fish honours the ichthyologist John S. Sparks of the United States National Museum and his wife Karen Riseng Sparks, they collected many of the type series.

References

 Loiselle, P. 2006. A review of the Malagasy Pachypanchax (Teleostei: Cyprinodontiformes, Aplocheilidae), with descriptions of four new species. Zootaxa 1366: 1–44 (2006)
 

sparksorum
Freshwater fish of Madagascar
Taxa named by Paul V. Loiselle
Taxonomy articles created by Polbot
Fish described in 2006